Théo Jérôme Julien Pourchaire (born 20 August 2003) is a French racing driver currently competing in the 2023 FIA Formula 2 Championship for the ART Grand Prix team and the reigning Formula 2 vice-champion. He is currently a member of the Sauber Academy and serves as a test and reserve driver for Alfa Romeo Racing.

Pourchaire started racing in single-seaters in 2018, and proceeded to win the Junior French F4 Championship. The following year, he moved up and won the 2019 ADAC Formula 4 Championship, scrapping with Dennis Hauger to the title. Pourchaire signed with ART Grand Prix for the 2020 FIA Formula 3 Championship and ended the season as runner-up behind Oscar Piastri by three points. He was promoted up to the FIA Formula 2 Championship remaining with ART where he finished fifth in the standings during his rookie year.

Career

Karting 
Born in Grasse, Pourchaire began karting at the age of two and a half and made his competitive debut at age seven. From there he claimed multiple championships in his native France, as well as finishing third in the CIK-FIA OKJ and DKM Junior championships.

Lower formulae

French F4 

In 2018, aged 15, Pourchaire stepped up to single-seaters, contesting the French F4 championship. Despite being ineligible for the main championship on account of his age, he claimed his first podiums by finishing second and third in two races at Circuit de Nogaro. During the second round in Pau, Pourchaire finished seventh, fourth and sixth. He would take his maiden single-seater victory in the second race at Spa-Francorchamps. It would be his only win of the season. His next podium came at Magny Cours with second place in the first race but retired in the second race due to a mechanical failure. He bounced back in the third race and claimed second place. but overall claimed seven podiums during the season. He claimed another podium with fourth (due to a guest driver getting third) in Jerez, and got a second and third places at the final round in Circuit Paul Ricard. Pourchaire finished the championship third with seven podiums, only behind Ugo de Wilde and champion Caio Collet. In the junior category, he claimed sixteen junior victories to be crowned Junior Champion.

ADAC Formula 4 

The following year, Pourchaire remained at Formula 4 level, but switched to the ADAC Formula 4 championship as part of the US Racing-CHRS outfit. Pourchaire secured his first podium in the series, with a second place in the second race at Oschersleben. At the Red Bull Ring, Pourchaire claimed another second place in the second race. However a penalty from Red Bull junior and championship rival Dennis Hauger saw Pourchaire take his maiden ADAC F4 win. He would follow up with third place the next day. Pourchaire included a double podium at the German Grand Prix support race, and added two more third-places at Zandvoort. At the Nürburgring, Pourchaire took a double victory that saw him extend his championship lead even further. At the Hockenheimring second round, Pourchaire had a poor showing, colliding with fellow Sauber junior member Arthur Leclerc in the first race and stalled in the second. With Hauger winning all three races, Pourchaire's lead in the championship shrunk from 68 to just a single point.  At the Sachsenring, Pourchaire claimed a win in the second race, and took runner-up position in the other two races. This was enough for Pourchaire to claim the championship title by seven points from Hauger.

FIA Formula 3 Championship 
In October 2019, Pourchaire attended the post-season test at Circuit Ricardo Tormo, contesting all three sessions with Carlin Buzz Racing and ART Grand Prix. Two months later, he joined the latter to contest the 2020 season. The season was set to start at Bahrain in March, but was postponed to July due to the Covid-19 pandemic. Pourchaire had a difficult start to the season for the first round at Red Bull Ring, finishing 13th and 26th thanks to his poor qualifying performance in 20th. That would soon be a thing of the past, qualifying fifth and finishing ninth in mixed conditions for Race 1 at the second Red Bull Ring round. It became second for Race 2, and took the lead from Jake Hughes into the first corner. Despite Hughes and Liam Lawson overtaking him, they would both collide later in the race, allowing Pourchaire to take his first FIA Formula 3 victory at just 16 years of age, making him the youngest driver to win in FIA Formula 3. Pourchaire qualified third at the Hungaroring, but moved up to first after overtaking Logan Sargeant and Alexander Smolyar touched. Despite a red flag, Pourchaire was untouchable throughout the race, winning by nearly 12 seconds. The win would prove to be his final one of the season. Pourchaire drove a clean second race to finish sixth.

Pourchaire topped practice in Silverstone, but had a difficult weekend as he only qualified 13th. He finished 12th in the first race and scored points in eighth in the second. Pourchaire qualified sixth at the second Silverstone race. He was immersed in a tense battle with Bent Viscaal and later Oscar Piastri but managed to hold on to sixth. In the second race, Pourchaire progressed up to third, taking his third podium of the year. He qualified eighth at Barcelona and finished seventh and sixth in Races 1 and 2 respectively.

Pourchaire qualified second on the front row alongside Lirim Zendeli at Spa-Francorchamps. Despite showing good pace, he was unable to advance on Zendeli and eventually finished second. Pourchaire ran as high as third during the second race but eventually finished fifth after Lawson and Smolyar overtook him. Following the weekend, Pourchaire began a streak of four consecutive podiums. He started off the Monza weekend with his first pole position. However, he was served a five-place grid drop for driving unnecessarily slowly, which could potentially cause a dangerous situation. Pourchaire climbed to third at the start, and managed to take the lead from Lawson on lap 4. On the third last lap however, a hard-charging Frederik Vesti passed Pourchaire for the lead, and so he settled for second. Pourchaire slipped to 17th after a poor start in Race 2, but took advantage when other drivers were involved in incidents, including future championship rivals Piastri and Logan Sargeant. A late move on Zendeli saw Pourchaire finish in third before a penalty for Lawson gave him second place. Leaving the weekend, Pourchaire sat third in the standings, 24 points adrift of championship leader Piastri. His late surge in performance hauled him into the championship fight going into the final round at Mugello. Pourchaire qualified seventh, ahead of Piastri but behind Sargeant. Pourchaire was involved in an intense battle with Sargeant and won it out on lap 9. On the final lap, he overtook Zendeli to place third in Race 1. It meant that Pourchaire was only nine points off the championship lead. In the championship decider, Sargeant was taken out in a first lap collision. Pourchaire managed to improve to third, but unfortunately, Piastri also improved, finishing seventh. This meant that Pourchaire finished as vice-champion to Piastri missing out by three points. During the whole season, Pourchaire managed eight podiums, including two victories, and was one of the few full-time drivers to finish every race.

FIA Formula 2 Championship

2020: Formula 2 debut 

In October 2020, it was announced that Pourchaire would make his FIA Formula 2 Championship debut at the final two rounds of the 2020 season at the Bahrain International Circuit. He drove for HWA Racelab, replacing former FIA Formula 3 competitor Jake Hughes and partnering Artem Markelov. Pourchaire qualified 16th for the first feature race and finished 18th. In the first sprint race, he was forced to retire when his fire extinguisher deployed inside his cockpit. He finished the final two races in 18th and 21st place, respectively.

2021: Learning year and maiden Formula 2 victories 

Pourchaire drove for ART Grand Prix at the post-season Formula 2 test in December 2020, and in January 2021 it was announced that he would join the team for the 2021 Formula 2 Championship alongside then Alpine junior Christian Lundgaard. Looking towards his first full campaign of F2, Pourchaire stated that "[this] year will be tough, but it is going to be really important."

At the season opener in Bahrain, Pourchaire initially qualified eleventh. However, when Jüri Vips was disqualified due to a technical irregularity, Pourchaire was promoted to tenth and would start on reverse pole in the first sprint. Luck would not strike him in the first race. After being overtaken by Liam Lawson at the start, Pourchaire retired from second place with a mechanical issue on lap 13. Pourchaire scored his first Formula 2 points by recovering to sixth in the second sprint, having started 19th. In the feature race, Pourchaire drove a clean race to finish eighth. Pourchaire took his maiden and only F2 pole of the year in Monaco, breaking the record for the youngest F2 polesitter. 
He finished seventh and fourth in the sprint races. Pourchaire once again broke another record, winning the feature race by nearly three seconds from pole position. In doing so, he became the youngest driver ever to win a F2/GP2 race, usurping the record previously held by Lando Norris. Upon winning, Pourchaire admitted that "he cried on the radio" and it was "a dream come true". His win moved him into third place in the championship.

Pourchaire qualified fourth and finished sprint race 1 in fifth, following passes on Ralph Boschung and Marcus Armstrong during the final few laps at Baku. He was involved in an incident with Boschung at the start, damaging his front wing whilst trying to overtake him. He managed to recover, only to finish just outside the points in ninth. Pourchaire broke and fractured his wrist on his left arm in a first-lap collision with Marcus Armstrong and Dan Ticktum during the feature race. Afterwards, Pourchaire called Ticktum an "idiot", who was handed a penalty during the race. Pourchaire was uncertain at first about driving at the next round in Silverstone but managed to recover before the round began. Pourchaire scored points in the first sprint and the feature race, finishing fifth and eighth respectively, despite suffering "a little bit of pain in his wrist" from Baku.

Pourchaire won his second F2 race of the year, winning the opening race at Monza. He overtook Ticktum on the second lap for third and took the lead from a struggling Vips on lap 15. Pourchaire was on route to take another Monza podium in third place, but on the penultimate lap, a resurgent Ticktum on fresher tyres passed him for the podium place. Pourchaire impressed during qualifying once again, picking up third at Sochi. Pourchaire was running in sixth during the first sprint, but with three laps to go, Jehan Daruvala spun in front of him, elevating him into fifth. The feature race was more successful for Pourchaire, as a good start saw him jump Daruvala at the start into the first corner. On lap 8, Pourchaire attempted an overcut on race leader Oscar Piastri. The following lap, Pourchaire entered the pits and exited ahead of Piastri. But just a few seconds later, Pourchaire, with much colder tires, was passed by Piastri. For the rest of the race, Pourchaire would continue to pressure Piastri but lost out to victory by 2 seconds, eventually taking second place. Following the weekend, Pourchaire did a French F4 test at the Circuit Paul Ricard.

Pourchaire once again qualified third at Jeddah, outqualifying everyone bar the two Prema cars. While running in seventh during the sprint race 1, Pourchaire spun and crashed into the wall, his car unable to continue. In the second race, he made an incredible charge from 19th to finish sixth. After the race, Pourchaire commented that "[it] was really hard to drive the car" following his crash in sprint race 1. He was involved in a serious accident with F3 graduate and future full-timer Enzo Fittipaldi at the feature race. Fittipaldi crashed into Pourchaire who had stalled on the grid. Pourchaire escaped unscathed, but Fittipaldi was injured. The weekend summed up a disappointing one for Pourchaire, scoring only 4 points. Following his seventh and ninth places in the sprint races, Pourchaire ended the Abu Dhabi feature race in fourth after a battle with third-placed Felipe Drugovich. Pourchaire finished his rookie season in Formula 2 with 140 points, good for fifth place in the championship, and was far ahead of teammate Lundgaard who had only 50 to his name. During the season, Pourchaire achieved a total of one pole position, two wins, four fastest laps and three podiums.

2022: Vice-champion 

Pourchaire stayed with ART Grand Prix for the 2022 season, alongside F3 graduate and Mercedes junior Frederik Vesti.

At the first round of the season in Bahrain, Pourchaire was immediately on the get-go, qualifying second behind pole-sitter Jack Doohan. During the sprint, Pourchaire made progress in the early stages of the race, improving to fifth which included a spectacular overtake on Felipe Drugovich. Unfortunately, as soon as the safety car had ended, Pourchaire began to lose power and dropped down the order. He would pull into the pits on the same lap and retire. His fortunes would eventually be reversed in the feature race. Pourchaire suffered wheelspin at the start and dropped to 4th at the end of the first lap. Following the safety car restart, Pourchaire passed Ralph Boschung and settled into third. A slow pit stop for then race leader Jüri Vips and second-placed Doohan, who damaged his front wing after making contact with Pourchaire, saw him move into the race lead and go on to win the feature race. After the race, Pourchaire said that "his visor broke" and it was "difficult to concentrate" during the race. The second round in Jeddah went horribly for Pourchaire. He suffered a crash in practice and an engine failure in qualifying, which led him to qualify in 21st. Pourchaire was unable to progress to the points during the sprint race, due to spending half of the race under the safety car. Pourchaire would be hit with more bad luck as on the fifth lap of the feature race, he was forced to retire with a gearbox problem and therefore dropped to fifth in the championship.

Pourchaire was back on form for the third round at Imola, qualifying in seventh. He started in fourth for the sprint race but fell to seventh, where he remained for the whole of the race. Pourchaire had a much better feature race when mishaps occurred to drivers who started ahead of him, including crashes from polesitter Vips and race leader Roy Nissany. This allowed him to take his second win of the year and take the championship from Drugovich, who only finished tenth. Pourchaire once again qualified seventh, at Barcelona.  Pourchaire had a miserable first lap starting third, falling to seventh. However, he made it back up to finish fifth after Vips spun and an overtake on a struggling Jake Hughes. In the feature race, Pourchaire ran as high as fifth, but drivers on fresher and softer tyres passed him and he fell to eighth. Since Drugovich won both races in Barcelona, Pourchaire lost the championship lead once again.

Pourchaire qualified second at Monaco, alongside championship rival Drugovich, as a red flag thwarted his attempts to improve his lap further. He made a great start, passing the stalled Hughes, Liam Lawson, and Doohan to finish the sprint race in sixth. In the feature race, Pourchaire was second behind Drugovich until the safety car was brought out. Despite a slow pit stop by Drugovich, Pourchaire was unable to capitalise on Drugovich's mistake as his stop was equally slow. After the safety car withdrew, Pourchaire pressured Drugovich for the next 20 laps but was unable to find a way past, and settled for second. Pourchaire qualified a disappointing 12th in Baku, which was the first time he qualified outside the top 10 on pure pace in Formula 2. Despite a rocky start, Pourchaire progressed up the field in the sprint race, taking advantage of numerous incidents to finish seventh. In the feature race, Pourchaire made a great start this time, making up three positions. However, during a safety car restart, he sustained front wing damage and was forced to pit. He recovered, but finished just outside the points in eleventh.

Pourchaire qualified fourth in Silverstone, setting the same lap time as Drugovich, but he set his lap time first. Pourchaire finished fourth in the sprint, managing his tyres well to overtake his rivals. In the feature race, Pourchaire made an electric start, jumping to second after passing Drugovich and Vesti. He pressured race leader Logan Sargeant throughout the race. However, Pourchaire was unable to find a way past and ended second. Pourchaire qualified ninth at the Red Bull Ring, thanks to rivals having their lap times deleted. He finished second in the sprint race, unable to find a way past Marcus Armstrong. He was unexpectedly summoned to the stewards for exceeding track limits, but ultimately kept his podium. In the feature race, Pourchaire started on wet tyres on a damp, drying track. It would turn out to be the wrong decision, and pitted for dry tyres. Pourchaire would be stuck behind Drugovich for the rest of the race and finished 13th with penalties applied. With Sargeant winning the last two feature races, Pourchaire falls to third in the championship.

At his home round in France, Pourchaire qualified fifth. In the sprint race, he passed Drugovich at the start and settled into fourth. On lap 19 of 21, Pourchaire made a pass on Armstrong to finish third. He dedicated the podium to fellow Frenchman Anthoine Hubert, who was killed during a crash in the 2019 Spa-Francorchamps Formula 2 round. However, following the race, Pourchaire received a 5-second time penalty for pushing Armstrong off the track while overtaking him, which saw Pourchaire demoted to seventh. During the feature race, Pourchaire pitted earlier than his rivals in front, which saw him move up to second, behind Ayumu Iwasa. He survived a late scare from Doohan, the Australian who spun while trying to pass him. Pourchaire ultimately finished second, eight seconds behind Iwasa. His result allows Pourchaire to move back into second place in the championship, trailing championship leader Drugovich by 39 points. In Hungary, Pourchaire qualified fourth, a place below Drugovich. On the first lap of the sprint race, Pourchaire dropped to 15th after avoiding a spinning Dennis Hauger. He made great moves but finished ninth, scoring no points. During the feature race, Pourchaire moved into second place at the start and took net first place by passing Armstrong in the pits. He eventually took his third win of the year and his first since Imola. Following the race, Pourchaire described second-placed finisher Enzo Fittipaldi as "faster than me". As Drugovich finished only ninth, Pourchaire slashed his championship lead to 21 points heading into the summer break, reigniting the title fight.

During the summer break, Pourchaire announced that he would leave Formula 2 following the end of the season. He qualified eighth in Spa-Francorchamps, considerably behind Drugovich on pole. In the sprint race, he fell from third to fifth at the start and later was overtaken by Drugovich on fresher tyres to end sixth. In the feature race, Pourchaire was running a decent race before a gearbox issue on lap 3 forced him out of the race. He was shown to be very devastated while still in the car. His DNF saw Drugovich increase his lead to 43 points. At Zandvoort, things got off to a rough start as Pourchaire crashed out in qualifying, which left him down in 16th place. In the sprint race, his weekend got worse as on lap 2, he out-braked himself and ran through the gravel at turn 1, dropping him to the back of the field. He finished last out of the 20 finishers. In the feature race, Pourchaire started on the harder tyres, but his strategy would fail to work as a safety car  brought out by Marino Sato mid-race bunched the field up. He eventually pitted and had to make up a 13-second gap to the back of the pack. He made a last-lap dive on Jehan Daruvala to secure tenth place before a penalty for David Beckmann saw Pourchaire elevate to ninth. With Drugovich extending his lead further to 70 points, Pourchaire finally admitted that the "Formula 2 title is over for the 2022 campaign".

In Monza, Pourchaire was on a decent qualifying lap until Iwasa crashed and brought out the red flag, which left the Frenchman 14th on the grid. Needing to finish at least sixth to keep the championship alive, he made early progress, but on lap 14 took to the gravel while battling with Lawson. Pourchaire finished 17th, which sealed the drivers' title for Drugovich. His feature race would not even last half a lap, as he was clipped by Boschung and then later hit by Luca Ghiotto, ending his nightmare weekend. Pourchaire qualified third in the final round at Yas Marina. He would not score, as in the feature race he struck a bird while running fourth, causing him to retire. Despite that, he held on to second in the championship, scoring three wins, seven podiums, and 164 points.

Amid uncertainty over where he would be racing in 2023, Pourchaire tested for ART at the F2 post-season test at Yas Marina.

2023 
Pourchaire remained with ART Grand Prix for a third consecutive season in 2023 alongside reigning F3 champion Victor Martins.

During the first round in Bahrain, Pourchaire qualified on pole for the second time, beating his nearest rival by an astonishing 0.7s. A sensational start saw jump to fourth at the start, but tyre degradation saw the Frenchman lose one position mid-race. For the feature race, Pourchaire dominated to his sixth win overall, winning by a margin of 19 seconds. Despite the gap, he stated that he "could have driven a lot faster".

Formula One 
As part of his signing with US Racing-CHRS for the 2019 ADAC Formula 4 Championship, Pourchaire was made a member of the Sauber Junior Team. In June 2020, Pourchaire renewed his relationship with the scheme.

Pourchaire completed his first Formula One test in August 2021, driving the Alfa Romeo Racing C38 at the Hungaroring. Pourchaire was listed as one of the contenders to fill the second seat at Alfa Romeo alongside Valtteri Bottas, but instead went to Zhou Guanyu. Alfa Romeo team boss Frédéric Vasseur stating that it was "too risky" to promote Pourchaire.

He moved into a testing role with Alfa Romeo F1 Team for the  season and took part in one Friday free practice session (FP1). Pourchaire made his FP1 debut with Alfa Romeo at the 2022 United States Grand Prix, while also confirming that he would become the team's reserve driver for 2023. Pourchaire also participated in the post-season tests in Abu Dhabi.

Formula E 
In May 2022, Pourchaire revealed that he tested the new Formula E Gen3 car in early 2022. He completed three days of testing and commented that the car was "very good" and "very fast".

Pourchaire was in contention for a Nissan Formula E seat for the 2022–23 season, before the team announced Norman Nato and Sacha Fenestraz for that season.

Super Formula 
Pourchaire was set for a Super Formula test at the Suzuka Circuit from December 7-8 with Kondo Racing but was called off.

Personal life 
Away from the track, Pourchaire relaxes himself by playing Call of Duty and Grand Theft Auto and is a big fan of the saga Star Wars. He is also a big fan of Formula One champions Fernando Alonso and Michael Schumacher.

Karting record

Karting career summary

Racing record

Racing career summary 

* Season still in progress.

Complete French F4 Junior Championship results 
(key) (Races in bold indicate pole position) (Races in italics indicate fastest lap)

Complete ADAC Formula 4 Championship results
(key) (Races in bold indicate pole position) (Races in italics indicate fastest lap)

Complete FIA Formula 3 Championship results
(key) (Races in bold indicate pole position points) (Races in italics indicate fastest lap points for the fastest lap from top-10 finishers)

‡ Half points awarded as less than 75% of race distance was completed.

Complete FIA Formula 2 Championship results
(key) (Races in bold indicate pole position) (Races in italics indicate points for the fastest lap of top ten finishers)

* Season still in progress.

Complete Formula One participations 
(key) (Races in bold indicate pole position) (Races in italics indicate fastest lap)

References

External links
  
 

2003 births
Living people
French racing drivers
French F4 Championship drivers
ADAC Formula 4 drivers
ADAC Formula 4 champions
People from Grasse
FIA Formula 3 Championship drivers
FIA Formula 2 Championship drivers
Auto Sport Academy drivers
US Racing drivers
ART Grand Prix drivers
HWA Team drivers
Sportspeople from Alpes-Maritimes
Charouz Racing System drivers
Karting World Championship drivers
Sauber Motorsport drivers